is a former Japanese singer, voice actress, gravure model, and television personality. She debuted in 2005 as a member of the co-ed group AAA before leaving in 2007. She is also a former member of the groups Trefle and Emergency. In 2017, she retired from entertainment.

Career

Goto was added as a member to the co-ed group AAA and debuted with them in 2005. She left the group on June 11, 2007, citing health problems. In 2009, Goto re-emerged as a gravure idol with the release of her first DVD, Revive. In 2011, she became the host of the online show Raibubu.

In 2013, Goto joined the girl group Trefle and was active on their online radio program, A&G Girls Project Trefle. In the same year, Goto also joined the group Emergency with Masaya Onosaka and Yū Kobayashi under the name Dancing Yukari.

On July 29, 2016, Trefle announced that they would disband after their final concert on October 5, 2016. On January 19, 2017, Goto announced that she was leaving Emergency and was retiring from entertainment.

Discography

Filmography

Television

Video game

Solo DVDs

References

1988 births
AAA (band) members
Japanese gravure models
Japanese television personalities
Japanese voice actresses
Living people
Singers from Tokyo